Problem Child is a 1990 American black comedy film directed by Dennis Dugan in his feature film directorial debut and produced by Robert Simonds. It stars John Ritter, Michael Oliver, Jack Warden, Gilbert Gottfried, Amy Yasbeck, and Michael Richards. It was released on July 27, 1990.

The film received negative reviews from critics but was a box office success, grossing $72.2 million worldwide against a production budget of $10 million.

It was followed by two sequels, Problem Child 2 (1991) and the made for TV Problem Child 3: Junior in Love (1995).

Plot
Ben Healy is a pleasant but browbeaten yuppie working for his father "Big Ben", a tyrannical sporting goods dealer running for mayor. Ben would love to have a son, but his obnoxious wife Flo has been unable to conceive. Ben approaches less-than-scrupulous adoption agent Igor Peabody with his dilemma, and Peabody presents Ben and Flo with a cute 7-year-old boy, Junior. 

However, Junior is hardly a model child; mean-spirited and incorrigible, the child leaves a path of serious destruction in his wake, and is even pen pals with Martin Beck, a notorious serial killer. The cat ends up in the hospital, Big Ben ends up falling down the stairs, and the house catches on fire. He messes up a camping trip with the neighbors by urinating in the fire, and manipulating a practical joke played on the kids by their father. He then terrorizes his neighbor's birthday party, after Lucy, the snobby birthday girl, bans him from the magic show. Finally, Junior displays his method for winning in Little League, which involves hitting rival players in the crotch with a baseball bat. Ben is having serious doubts about Junior, and takes him back to the orphanage. However, upon hearing he was returned to the orphanage thirty times by previous adoptive families, he decides to keep him and love him, something no one has ever done. Distraught that his parents do not love him, Junior retaliates by driving Ben's car into his father's store, and his bank account is wiped out to pay for the damages. Ben is on the verge of cracking until Beck arrives at the house, and decides to kidnap his faithful correspondent, along with Flo. 

While Ben first sees this as good riddance to his browbeating wife and the trouble making Junior, he soon notices signs that Junior is not the monster he appeared; through a series of pictures Junior drew, he depicts children and adults who treated him poorly as deformed monsters with hostile surroundings, but depicted Ben as a person in a pleasant background, revealing that he did value him as a father figure. Ben, realizing that Junior's behavior was simply a reaction to how he himself was treated as a child, undertakes a rescue mission to get Junior back from Beck.

Now exerting a more assertive attitude, Ben first steals his neighbor's car and hat, and confronts his father for money. When he is rudely dismissed, Ben pushes a button that puts Big Ben unknowingly on camera, where he ends up revealing his true nature on the news, even mooning the camera.

Ben catches up with Beck and Junior at the circus. Junior is rescued after escaping from Beck through a trapeze act. Beck drives away, but the Healys are now on his tail. After a collision, Flo, who was stuffed in a suitcase, flies over the wall and ends up in the back of a truck loaded with pigs. Beck is arrested, but not before getting a shot off, which hits Ben in the chest. Thinking he has died, Junior apologizes and tells him he loves him. Ben wakes up and realizes the bullet ricocheted off his good-luck prune he was holding in his pocket. Junior then removes his bow tie and throws it over the bridge, as a symbol perhaps that he has changed his ways, and then walks away together with his new father.

Cast
 John Ritter as Benjamin "Ben" Healy Jr.
 Michael Oliver as Junior Healy
 Jack Warden as Benjamin "Big Ben" Healy Sr., Ben's wealthy, mean, and selfish father who holds contempt for his son's kindness and considerate personality.
 Gilbert Gottfried as Igor Peabody, the adoption agent at the orphanage who is Junior's nemesis and wants Junior out of the orphanage and out of his life.  
 Amy Yasbeck as Florence "Flo" Healy, Ben's social-climbing wife who cares far more about the image of being a wife and mother rather than the actual responsibilities or morals.
 Michael Richards as Martin Beck, an escaped convict who goes by the moniker "Bow-Tie Killer".
 Peter Jurasik as Roy, Ben and Flo's neighbor who is rather brash and arrogant.
 Colby Kline as Lucy Henderson, a mean and spoiled brat whose personality spurs Junior into ruining her 6th birthday party.
 Dennis Dugan (cameo) as All American Dad.

Production
The film was shot on location in Texas, from October 2 to November 24, 1989. The primary locations were Dallas, Farmers Branch, Fort Worth, Irving, and Mesquite. Also, there were two weeks of reshoots in Dallas in March 1990.

Dan Aykroyd, Chevy Chase, Richard Dreyfuss, Steve Martin, Rick Moranis and Kurt Russell were considered for the role of Little Ben before it was turned over to John Ritter. The part of Martin "The Bow-Tie Killer" Beck was originally offered to Christopher Lloyd, who turned it down because of his commitments with Back to the Future Part III, released two months before Problem Child, and was replaced by Michael Richards; this was the second role, following UHF (1989), that Lloyd had turned down only to be taken by Richards. A then-unknown child actor Macaulay Culkin reportedly auditioned for Junior, but Michael Oliver was ultimately cast. Culkin played a character akin to Junior albeit with a far darker motive three years later in The Good Son.

During a 2014 interview on Gilbert Gottfried's Amazing Colossal Podcast, screenwriters Scott Alexander and Larry Karaszewski revealed that the story was inspired by the 1988 Los Angeles Times article "An Adopted Boy--and Terror Begins" about a married couple suing an adoption agency after they were not informed that their adopted son had severe mental health issues with violent tendencies and had been previously returned to the agency multiple times. While other writers pitched the story as a horror film in the vein of Bad Seed or The Omen, Alexander and Karaszewski thought it had potential as a comedy, envisioning a dark, adult satire of the then-popular trend in films where cute kids teach cynical adults how to love, as seen in Baby Boom, Parenthood (directly spoofed by the film's poster), Look Who's Talking, Uncle Buck, Mr. Mom, Kindergarten Cop, and Three Men and a Baby. However, the studio insisted upon turning it into a children's film, a conversion that necessitated numerous reshoots and rewrites, leading to a difficult production that left all involved disappointed and anticipating a box office failure. It defied these expectations, becoming a surprise hit and Universal's most profitable film of 1990, but was still so embarrassing for Alexander and Karaszewski (Alexander even cried after the cast and crew screening) that they tried to distance themselves from it, which proved difficult. Studios were initially reluctant to hire them or take them seriously based on their work on such a prominent disreputable film but, as the years went by, they would eventually come to work with executives who were children when it first came out, and grew up watching its frequent TV airings, and were excited to be meeting its writers. Looking back, they still feel it's "a mess" but take some pride in being involved with one of the "very few [PG-rated] children's films that black and that crazy", citing the scene where Flo commits adultery with Martin while Ben is catatonic and contemplating murdering Junior in the next room as an example. They added, "And it's funny".

In 2015, Dennis Dugan revealed that he was hired to direct the film, his first feature one (he'd previously directed episodes of the TV series Moonlighting, Wiseguy, and Hunter), after jumping on a coffee table in a meeting with Universal executives: "You're looking at me like I'm fucking nuts, and this is what we want. We want this kind of chaos". Dugan suggested John Ritter, with whom he'd worked as an actor before turning to direct, for the role of Ben Healy. The studio was initially reluctant, feeling they needed a more famous actor, but eventually relented. Jack Warden turned down the role of "Big Ben" Healy before Dugan offered him half of his net points; he was so touched that he took the part, although he refused Dugan's offer. Amy Yasbeck was cast as Flo; she and Ritter fell in love during production, eventually marrying in 1999. Ritter died in 2003. Both Ritter and Gilbert Gottfried were allowed to ad lib while filming, but Universal reprimanded Dugan for shooting too much footage of the latter. The film's first test screening was disastrous, with 70 percent of the audience walking out, verbal complaints from viewers, and a score of only 30. The studio forced two weeks of reshoots, including a retooled ending and the addition of key scenes, such as Lucy's birthday party.

Music
A soundtrack was released by Universal the same day as the film, and included an original composition by The Beach Boys.

Reception

Box office
The film debuted at third place. It went on to be a commercial success at the box office, grossing $54 million domestically and $72 million worldwide.

Critical response
The film received negative reviews upon its release. On Rotten Tomatoes, the film has a rare approval rating of 0% based on 29 reviews, and an average rating of 2.3/10. The site's critical consensus reads: "Mean-spirited and hopelessly short on comic invention, Problem Child is a particularly unpleasant comedy, one that's loaded with manic scenery chewing and juvenile pranks". On Metacritic, it has a score of 27 out of 100 based on reviews from 12 critics, indicating "generally unfavorable reviews". Audiences surveyed by CinemaScore gave the film a grade "A−" on scale of A to F.

The film is heavily censored when shown on television, due to the remarks made about adoption, which critics saw as insensitive. It was not screened for critics prior to its release.

Hal Hinson, writing for The Washington Post:

Protests over posters
One of the posters for the film (shown above) showed a cat in a tumble dryer, with the implication being that Junior had put it inside. A group named In Defence Of Animals organized protests against the posters, and some cinemas took them down in response. Director Dennis Dugan later issued a disclaimer saying that "kitty in the dryer" was metaphorical and never an actual scene in the film. The protests sparked the inspiration for the film's sequel, this time with a poster of John Ritter inside a dryer looking out, while the cat stands by the dryer.

Accolades
For the film (as well as The Adventures of Ford Fairlane and Look Who's Talking Too), Gilbert Gottfried was nominated for a Golden Raspberry Award for Worst Supporting Actor, but lost to Donald Trump in Ghosts Can't Do It.

Home media
The film was more successful on home video. The VHS version adds an extra bit just before the closing credits, in which Junior interrupts it to tell the audience that he'll be back next summer for Problem Child 2. Then he disappears and a loud flatulent noise is heard, followed by Ben shouting "Junior!", him laughing, then the closing credits roll. The VHS version was released on January 31, 1991.

The first DVD release was released by GoodTimes Entertainment on May 1, 2001. It and Problem Child 2 were released together on DVD in the US on March 2, 2004, as a package entitled Problem Child Tantrum Pack. They were presented in open-matte full screen only. However, no home video release thus far features the deleted footage shown on TV airings of it.

The film was re-released on the Family Comedy Pack Quadruple Feature DVD (with other comedy films like Kindergarten Cop, Kicking & Screaming, and Major Payne) in anamorphic widescreen (being its first widescreen Region 1 DVD release) on August 5, 2008.

It was released on Blu-ray on October 10, 2017. Problem Child 2 was released on Blu-ray on May 15, 2018.

TV version
Problem Child first aired on NBC-TV on September 15, 1991, with 12 minutes of previously deleted scenes and all the profanity was dubbed with different and appropriate words and phrases.

Legacy

Sequels
The film inspired two sequels: the first, Problem Child 2, was released theatrically in 1991; the second, Problem Child 3: Junior in Love, was a television film aired on NBC in 1995. The first one brought back the original cast in their original roles and picked up where the first film ended. However, Yasbeck was given a new role with a new dynamic opposite to her original character. In the third and final film, William Katt and Justin Chapman replaced John Ritter and Michael Oliver as Ben and Junior respectively, while Gottfried and Warden reprised their roles as Igor Peabody and Big Ben and does not follow the storyline of the first two films.

Television series

The film was adapted into an animated television series that aired on USA Network for two seasons, from October 31, 1993, to December 4, 1994. Gottfried was the only original cast member to be featured as a voice-over actor, making him the only cast member involved in all three films as well as the cartoon (Warden was in all three films, but not the TV series).

In 2015, NBC ordered a pilot for a live-action TV series based on the film, produced by STXtelevision, Imagine TV, and NBCUniversal, but was never made.

In popular culture
Problem Child was featured in a famous scene from Martin Scorsese's 1991 remake of Cape Fear, where the movie is shown screening at a movie theatre attended by ex-convict Max Cady (Robert De Niro), attorney Sam Bowden (Nick Nolte) and the latter's family. Cady, trying to unsettle Bowden and his family, loudly and obnoxiously cackles at the film.

Adaptations
In 1995, a Turkish-language adaptation of the film was made called Zıpçıktı, which was directed by Ünal Küpeli and featured Şenol Coşkun in the lead role.

References

External links
 
 
 

1990 films
1990s black comedy films
American black comedy films
American independent films
1990s English-language films
Films directed by Dennis Dugan
Films with screenplays by Scott Alexander and Larry Karaszewski
Films about adoption
Films about pranks
Films adapted into television shows
Films produced by Robert Simonds
Films set in the 1980s
Films set in 1983
Films set in the 1990s
Films set in 1990
Films set in Illinois
Films shot in Dallas
Films shot in Fort Worth, Texas
Films shot in Texas
Imagine Entertainment films
Universal Pictures films
1990 directorial debut films
1990 comedy films
Films scored by Miles Goodman
Films about father–son relationships
1990s American films